Columbus is a city in and the county seat of Colorado County in southeastern Texas. The population was 3,699 as of the 2020 census. It is located on the Colorado River. The Colorado County Courthouse is listed on the National Register of Historic Places.

A Santa Claus museum is located in Columbus.

History

The first American settlers arrived in 1821 on what is known as the legendary site of Montezuma's Indian village. In 1822, the Mexican government issued land grants to members of Stephen F. Austin's Old Three Hundred, who included Benjamin Beason (originally spelled "Beeson") and Abram Alley. Alley's 1830s log cabin has been preserved in Columbus and is used as a tool museum. Beason arrived in 1821, received his land grant in 1822, and settled along the Colorado River with his wife Elizabeth "Betsy" and family. By late December 1821, colonists Robert H. Kuykendall with his brother Joseph, and Daniel Gilleland arrived in the area of present-day Columbus. In 1822, Benjamin Beason began operating a ferry across the Colorado River, and the settlement became known as Beason's Ferry or Beason's Crossing. Beason also established a gristmill, gin, and a sawmill; his wife operated a boarding house.

Beason's Crossing became part of Austin's San Felipe colony in 1822, when the colony was divided into two districts by the Mexican governor José F. Trespalacios. The Mexican government granted the rights to establish a town, and the locals elected town officials. John J. Tumlinson Sr., was elected alcalde, with Robert Kuykendall captain and Moses Morrison lieutenant. Tumlinson's land adjoined Beason's; together, they made up much of the site of present-day Columbus. Tumlinson was killed by Native Americans in 1823. In 1834, after the Tumlinson children inherited the estate, they sold land to William Dewees, who was married to Beason's daughter, Lydia. Dewees' land grant was near the site of present-day Glidden, Texas.

By 1836, Beason's Ferry Crossing was home to over 25 families. During the fight for Texas independence, Sam Houston and his men camped along the banks of the Colorado River near Beason's Crossing. Following the Battle of the Alamo, Santa Anna's army headed for San Jacinto, and Houston ordered that Beason's Crossing be burned during the Runaway Scrape.

Columbus was established by European Americans in 1837 after Texas achieved independence from Mexico. After the population returned following warfare, residents renamed Beason's Crossing "Columbus". Some speculate that it was named in honor of residents who migrated from Columbus, Ohio, while others believe the town was named after Christopher Columbus, who explored on behalf of Spain in the late 15th century.

The town of Columbus was platted again in 1837. The Dewees family gave land for a new school and possibly a courthouse. By 1837, the town had been re-established with two public houses, two stores, and half a dozen small dwellings.

It was later named the seat of Colorado County, and had developed as a center of business and trade for surrounding areas. Cattle ranching was big business by the late 19th century. Some merchants and ranchers did very well, and built fine houses in the city, such as the house built by Robert E. Stafford. He supported the Stafford Opera House, now serving also as a museum and performance space. In the late 19th and early 20th centuries, it attracted touring performers and lecturers. Other notable historic homes operated today as museums are the Dilue Rose Harris House Museum, and Tate-Senftenburg-Brandon House Museum. The Tate-Senftenburg-Brandon House, formerly owned by the Columbus Historical Preservation Trust, Inc., was sold to private owners in 2017 and is no longer operated as a museum but is being further restored and maintains its historic character. 

The Colorado County Courthouse was built in 1890, the fourth such structure in the city. It was designed in the Classical Revival and Italianate styles of architecture by noted Houston architect Eugene T. Heiner. He designed at least nine other Texas courthouses. The bell tower was damaged in a 1909 storm. The dome was added before 1939. It is listed on the National Register of Historic Places. In 2013–2014, the courthouse was being renovated and upgraded for current uses; the project included restoration of historic exterior colors.

Geography
It is located along Interstate 10, on the southwest side of the Colorado River.

Climate

The climate in this area is characterized by hot, humid summers and generally mild to cool winters.  According to the Köppen climate classification system, Columbus has a humid subtropical climate, Cfa on climate maps.

Demographics

In 1890, 2,199 people lived in Columbus. In 1900, the population declined to 1,824 residents.

As of the 2020 United States census, there were 3,699 people, 1,209 households, and 812 families residing in the city.

At the 2000 census, 3,916 people, 1,497 households and 946 families resided in the city. The 1,750 housing units averaged . The racial makeup of the city was 66.55% White, 19.94% African American, 0.36% Native American, 0.33% Asian, 0.03% Pacific Islander, 10.52% from other races, and 2.27% from two or more races. Hispanics or Latinos of any race were 17.62% of the population.

Of the 1,497 households, 28.4% had children under the age of 18 living with them, 45.8% were married couples living together, 14.0% had a female householder with no husband present, and 36.8% were not families. About 33.0% of all households were made up of individuals, and 19.6% had someone living alone who was 65 years of age or older. The average household size was 2.40 and the average family size was 3.04.

The population was distributed as 23.4% were under the age of 18, 8.2% from 18 to 24, 24.2% from 25 to 44, 19.6% from 45 to 64, and 24.5% who were 65 years of age or older. The median age was 40 years. For every 100 females, there were 88.2 males. For every 100 females age 18 and over, there were 84.2 males.

The median household income was $29,175 and for a family  was $40,197. Males had a median income of $30,104 compared with $19,077 for females. The per capita income for the city was $15,822. About 15.5% of families and 20.5% of the population were below the poverty line, including 32.7% of those under age 18 and 16.1% of those age 65 or over.

Arts and culture

In the 20th century, the Santa Claus Museum was established in town, based on the collection of Mary Elizabeth Hopkins (d. 1990) and located in her former residence. It has become a noted tourist destination in the region. The historic Alley Log Cabin and Tool Museum is another unique site, dating to the 1830s.

Education

The city is served by the Columbus Independent School District, which includes:
Columbus High School (9–12).
Columbus Junior High (6–8)
Columbus Elementary (PK–5)

The Columbus Cardinal mascot was named by James Harbert Wooten Jr., M.D.

Also in Columbus are Saint Anthony School, a Catholic school of the Roman Catholic Diocese of Victoria in Texas serving students in grades pre-kindergarten through eight, and Texas Bible Institute, a branch of Burchfield Ministries International.

The designated community college for Columbus ISD is Wharton County Junior College.

Infrastructure

Highways

Notable people

 Donna Campbell, former resident; member of the Texas Senate and an emergency room physician in New Braunfels
* Tanya McQueen, interior designer for the TV reality show, Extreme Makeover: Home Edition
 Doug Rau, former Major League Baseball pitcher for the Los Angeles Dodgers
 Aaron Schobel, NFL defensive end with the Buffalo Bills
 Bo Schobel, defensive end with the Arizona Cardinals
 Matt Schobel, tight end with the Philadelphia Eagles
 Hal Smith, former Major League catcher and third baseman during 1955–1964
 James Truchard, co-founder of National Instruments
 LaAdrian Waddle, NFL player for the New England Patriots

See also

List of museums in East Texas

References

External links

 City of Columbus official website
 Columbus Convention and Visitors Bureau
 Columbus Independent School District

Cities in Texas
Cities in Colorado County, Texas
County seats in Texas